Ivar Hognestad (born 22 February 1956) is a Norwegian politician for the Progress Party.

He served as a deputy representative to the Norwegian Parliament from Vest-Agder during the term 2005–2009.

On the local level, he has background from Sirdal municipal council.

References

1956 births
Living people
Deputy members of the Storting
Progress Party (Norway) politicians
Vest-Agder politicians
Place of birth missing (living people)
21st-century Norwegian politicians